Ditlev Emanuel Torm (24 April 1836 – 22 November 1907) was a Danish businessman and co-founder of the shipping company Dampskibsselskabet Torm.

Early life and education
Torm was born in Aalborg, the son of merchant and later shipbroker in Randers Ulrich Frederik T. (1801–1866) and Severine Birgitte Friis (1803–1881). He went to sea at the age of 14 and passed his exams as a navigator in 1853. He then served aboard English, German and American vessels. In 1862, he was also certified as an English mate in Hong Kong. He spent the next ten years in the Far East with only one short interruption.

Career
He left the company when he was treated unfairly in connection with the wrecking of S.S. Fyn. In 1879, he started  with a single steam vessel. In 1889. he then founded Dampskibsselskabet Torm in a partnership with Christian Schmiegelow. The company had an initial capital of DKK 212,000. Torm headed the office while Schmiegelow sailed their first ship, the steamer S.S. Alice. The company's fleet grew steadily. It focused on the Baltic Sea and North Sea.

He was also a member of the Maritime and Commercial Court.

Personal life
Torm married Elise Helene Mathilde Zoéga (30 January 1846 – 16 March 1918) on 28 March 1868 in Flensburg. Their son, Frederik Torm, was a theologian.

Torm died on 22 November 1907 in Copenhagen. He is buried in Assistens Cemetery.

References

External links

 Ditlev Torm at geni.com

19th-century Danish businesspeople
20th-century Danish businesspeople
Danish businesspeople in shipping
Businesspeople from Aalborg
Danish company founders
1836 births
1907 deaths